Emery Clarence Leonard (1892–1968) was an American botanist known for his work on the Acanthaceae plant family and on the flora of Haiti.

References

1892 births
1968 deaths
American botanists